Narechen, also called Narechenski Bani, is a village in  Plovdiv Province, central Bulgaria.  it had 719 inhabitants. It is set amid a pine forest on the Asenitsa River (formerly named the Chepelare River) in the Rhodope mountains, 42 km southwest of Plovdiv. The village is notable for its hypothermal mineral springs which was transformed into a spa resort.

Notes

Villages in Plovdiv Province
Spa towns in Bulgaria